Grand Blanc High School (GBHS) is a public high school in Grand Blanc, Michigan, in the United States. It is managed by Grand Blanc Community Schools.

Demographics
The demographic breakdown of the 2699 students enrolled for the 2012–2013 school year is as follows:

Male – 51.9%
Female – 48.1%
Native American/Alaskan – 0.3%
Asian/Pacific islander – 2.8%
Black – 14.9%
Hispanic – 3.1%
White – 74.6%
Multiracial – 4.3%

Athletics
The following sports are offered at Grand Blanc:

Baseball (boys) . state champs in 2021
Basketball (girls & boys) boys state champs in 2021
Bowling (girls & boys)
Competitive cheer (girls) 
Cross country (girls & boys)
Boys state champion – 1977, 1979
Football (boys)
Golf (girls & boys)
Boys state champion – 2004, 2008
Girls state champion – 1985, 1988, 1991, 2000, 2004, 2005, 2006, 2007
Ice Hockey (boys)
Lacrosse (girls & boys)
Skiing (girls & boys)
Soccer (girls & boys)
Softball (girls)
Swim & dive (girls & boys)
Tennis (girls & boys)
Track & field (girls & boys)
Volleyball (girls)
Wrestling (boys)

Most teams participate in the Saginaw Valley League as of 2018.

Notable alumni 
 Andrew Caldwell – actor
Zach Carroll - professional soccer player
 Ty Dellandrea – ice hockey player
 Geena Gall – Olympic mid-distance runner
 Mark Ingram II – NFL running back
 Rob Paulsen - voice actor and singer
 Evan Peters – actor
 Carson Dach - NFL Long Snapper
 Gabe Martin - NFL Linebacker
 Bob Suci - NFL Defensive Back
 Dennis Busby - NHL Draft Pick
Grant Fisher - Olympic Distance Runner

References

External links 
 

Public high schools in Michigan
Educational institutions established in 1964
Schools in Genesee County, Michigan
1964 establishments in Michigan